Treisman is a surname. Notable persons with that name include:

Anne Treisman (1935–2018), British psychologist
 David Treisman, known as David Caminer (1915–2008), British electronic systems analyst
Philip Treisman, American mathematician
Sir Richard Henry Treisman, Fellow of the Royal Society, see list of Fellows

See also
David Triesman, Baron Triesman, Labour member of the House of Lords